Argentina Brunetti (born Argentina Josefina Ángela Ferraù; August 31, 1907 – December 20, 2005) was an Argentinian stage and film actress and writer.

Biography
Brunetti was born Argentina Ferraù in Buenos Aires, Argentina to Italian parents; her mother was the Sicilian actress Mimi Aguglia. She began her show-business career at the age of three with a walk-on role in the opera Cavalleria Rusticana and followed in the footsteps of her mother, performing supporting roles on stage throughout Europe and South America. In 1928 she and her family entered the U.S.

In 1937, she was placed under contract to Metro-Goldwyn-Mayer and began dubbing the voices of Jeanette MacDonald and Norma Shearer into Italian. She became a narrator for the Voice of America, interviewing American movie stars for broadcast in Italy. At the same time, she made her movie debut in the classic It's a Wonderful Life (1946) as Mrs. Maria Martini.

Brunetti wrote and performed in daily radio shows; she became a member of the Hollywood Foreign Press Association, writing numerous articles on Hollywood personalities; she authored books, wrote music, and appeared in nearly 60 television programmes and almost 70 films. She hosted a weekly weblog on the Internet called Argentina Brunetti's Hollywood Stories, which her son plans to continue running, and wrote a biographical novel called In Sicilian Company. She continued to act into her nineties, most notably as a relative from the Old World who visits and stays with the (wrong) Barone family in a 1999 episode of Everybody Loves Raymond; her last role was in 2002.

Marriage
She wed Miro Brunetti, a foreign correspondent in Hollywood. The two helped to co-found the Hollywood Foreign Press Association. The couple had one son, Mario. Miro Brunetti died in 1966. Argentina Brunetti never remarried.

Last years and death
She moved to Rome in 2004 to be with her family and died there from natural causes on December 20, 2005, aged 98.

Filmography

 Gilda (1946) .... Woman (uncredited)
 The Return of Monte Cristo (1946) .... (uncredited)
 It's a Wonderful Life (1946) .... Mrs. Maria Martini
 California (1946) .... Elvira
 High Tide (1947) .... Mrs. Cresser
 Tycoon (1947) .... Señora Ayora – House Guest (uncredited)
 Tenth Avenue Angel (1948) .... Boy's Mother (uncredited)
 Man-Eater of Kumaon (1948) .... Sita
 Mexican Hayride (1948) .... Indian Woman (uncredited)
 Shockproof (1949) .... Stella (uncredited)
 Knock on Any Door (1949) .... Ma Romano (uncredited)
 El Paso (1949) .... Don Nacho's Woman (uncredited)
 We Were Strangers (1949) .... Mother (uncredited)
 House of Strangers (1949) .... Applicant (uncredited)
 The Red Danube (1949) .... Italian Woman (uncredited)
 Holiday in Havana (1949) .... Mrs. Estrada (uncredited)
 The Silver Theater (1950, TV Series) .... Mama Romani
 The Blonde Bandit (1950) .... Mama Sapelli
 Captain Carey, U.S.A. (1950) .... Villager (uncredited)
 The Lawless (1950) .... Mrs. Rodriguez
 Broken Arrow (1950) .... Nalikadeya, Cochise's Wife (uncredited)
 Dial 1119 (1950) .... Bus Passenger (uncredited)
 Southside 1–1000 (1950) .... Storekeeper Babo's Wife (uncredited)
 Ghost Chasers (1951) .... Mrs. Parelli
 The Great Caruso (1951) .... Signora Barretto
 Sirocco (1951) .... Woman (uncredited)
 Force of Arms (1951) .... Signora Maduvalli (uncredited)
 Rose of Cimarron (1952) .... Red Fawn
 The Fighter (1952) .... Maria
 When in Rome (1952) .... Mrs. Lugacetti
 Bal Tabarin (1952) .... Teresa (uncredited)
 Apache War Smoke (1952) .... Madre
 Woman in the Dark (1952) .... 'Mama' Morello
 The Iron Mistress (1952) .... Duenna (uncredited)
 Hopalong Cassidy (1952, TV Series) .... Senora Soledad
 Racket Squad (1952, TV Series) .... Mrs. Scarpita
 My Cousin Rachel (1952) .... Signora (uncredited)
 Tropic Zone (1953) .... Tia Feliciana
 San Antone (1953) .... Mexican Woman
 The Story of Three Loves (1953) .... Saleswoman (segment "Mademoiselle") (scenes deleted)
 The Caddy (1953) .... Mama Anthony
 King of the Khyber Rifles (1953) .... Lali
 Waterfront (1954, TV Series) .... Mama Ferrera
 Make Haste to Live (1954) .... Mrs. Gonzales
 The Lone Wolf (1954, TV Series) .... Mama Crocetti
 The Public Defender (1954, TV Series) .... Mrs. Derek
 Lux Video Theatre (1954, TV Series)
 The Lone Ranger (1955, TV Series) .... Maria
 The Prodigal (1955) .... Townswoman (uncredited)
 Hell's Island (1955) .... Pottery Maker (uncredited)
 The Far Horizons (1955) .... Old Crone
 The Last Command (1955) .... Maria (uncredited)
 Jane Wyman Presents The Fireside Theatre (1955, TV Series) .... Mrs. Adams
 The Tall Men (1955) .... Maria the Dressmaker (uncredited)
 Letter to Loretta (1954–1955, TV Series) .... Mrs. Nardo / Mrs. Ferenzi
 The Rains of Ranchipur (1955) .... Mrs. Adoani (uncredited)
 TV Reader's Digest (1955, TV Series) .... Mrs. Barrett
 The 20th Century-Fox Hour (1956, TV Series) .... Mrs. Rosa Hernandez
 Matinee Theatre (1956, TV Series)
 Celebrity Playhouse (1956, TV Series)
 Anything Goes (1956) .... Suzanne
 Telephone Time (1956, TV Series) .... Senora Valdes
 Alfred Hitchcock Presents (1956, TV Series) .... Mrs. Salvatori
 Navy Log (1956, TV Series) .... Mme. Deschamps
 Three Violent People (1956) .... Maria
 Duel at Apache Wells (1957) .... Tia Maria
 The Adventures of Jim Bowie (1957, TV Series) .... Tri Rosa
 Panic! (1957, TV Series) .... Tina D'Alessio
 Code 3 (1957, TV Series) .... Mrs. Morales
 The Unholy Wife (1957) .... Theresa
 The Midnight Story (1957) .... Mama Malatesta
 The Brothers Rico (1957) .... Mrs. Rico
 The Veil (1958, TV Mini-Series) .... Maria
 The Thin Man (1958, TV Series) .... Shana Daupha
 Showdown at Boot Hill (1958) .... Mrs. Barabbas
 M Squad (1959, TV Series) .... Mrs. Doris Michaels
 Jet Over the Atlantic (1959) .... Miss Hooten
 Westinghouse Desilu Playhouse (1959, TV Series) .... Elena
 The Detectives Starring Robert Taylor (1960, TV Series) .... Mrs. Moretti
 The Untouchables (1959–1960, TV Series) .... Mrs. Swoboda / Sophia Cestari
 General Electric Theater (1960, TV Series) .... Saral
 Bonanza (1960, TV Series) .... Bruja's Helper
 Rawhide (1960, TV Series) .... Rosa Patines
 The Deputy (1960, TV Series) .... Evita
 Thriller (1960, TV Series) .... Mrs. Romano
 Wanted: Dead or Alive (1960, TV Series) .... Juanita Domingo
 The Roaring Twenties (1960, TV Series) .... Mamma Zorich
 Coronado 9 (1960, TV Series) .... Mrs. Dominguez
 Tales of Wells Fargo (1961, TV Series) .... Maria
 Lock Up (1961, TV Series) .... Mrs. Voltaire
 Alcoa Presents: One Step Beyond (1960–1961, TV Series) .... Maria Gonzalez / Margarita Castera
 Checkmate (1961, TV Series) .... Berta
 Wagon Train (1961, TV Series) .... Lisa Canevari
 Route 66 (1961, TV Series) .... Senora Maria Otero
 The Lawless Years (1961, TV Series) .... Mama Matteo
 Miami Undercover (1961, TV Series) .... Mrs. Alemada
 The George Raft Story (1961) .... Mrs. Raft
 The Many Loves of Dobie Gillis (1961, TV Series) .... Grandmother
 The Rifleman (1962, TV Series) .... Mrs. Ramirez
 The Horizontal Lieutenant (1962) .... The Nun (uncredited)
 The Pigeon That Took Rome (1962) .... Relative at Easter Dinner (uncredited)
 The Gallant Men (1962, TV Series) .... Mother Superior
 Going My Way (1962–1963, TV Series) .... Mrs. Molletti / Mrs. Severino
 General Hospital (1963, TV Series) .... Filomena Soltini (1985–1986)
 7 Faces of Dr. Lao (1964) .... Sarah Benedict
 Stage to Thunder Rock (1964) .... Sarita
 Ben Casey (1965, TV Series) .... Mrs. Sanchez
 The Money Trap (1965) .... Aunt
 Gunsmoke (1965, TV Series) .... Louise Danby
 The F.B.I. (1966, TV Series) .... Tia Rodriguez
 The Fugitive (1966, TV Series) .... Mexican Woman
 The Andy Griffith Show .... La Farona (1966, TV Series)
 The Appaloosa (1966) .... Yaqui woman (uncredited)
 The Venetian Affair (1967) .... The Nun (uncredited)
 The Invaders (1967, TV Series) .... Luz
 The Man from U.N.C.L.E. (1967, TV Series) .... Proprietor
 Gomer Pyle, U.S.M.C. (1967, TV Series) .... Cara
 The Big Valley (1968, TV Series) .... Maria
 I Spy (1968, TV Series) .... Chica
 The Shakiest Gun in the West (1968) .... Squaw (uncredited)
 Ironside (1968, TV Series) .... Rita's Aunt
 The Flying Nun (1969, TV Series) .... Consuelo Gomez / Woman #2
 The High Chaparral (1969, TV Series) .... Duena Lopez
 To Rome with Love (1970, TV Series) .... Josie
 The Barefoot Executive (1971) .... Mrs. Bernaducci (uncredited)
 The Streets of San Francisco (1973, TV Series) .... Consuela
 Temperatures Rising (1973, TV Series)
 The Magician (1974, TV Series) .... Landlady
 Kojak (1976, TV Series) .... Christina
 Flight to Holocaust (1977, TV Movie) .... Woman in Elevator
 Wonder Woman (1977, TV Series) .... Manageress
 Black Market Baby (1977, TV Movie) .... Aunt Imelda
 Blue Sunshine (1977) .... Mrs. Rosella
 Quincy, M.E. (1978, TV Series) .... Mrs. Maggiore
 Fantasy Island (1978, TV Series) .... Teresa
 Tenspeed and Brown Shoe (1980, TV Series) .... Celeste Diagusta
 Fatso (1980) .... Zi Jule
 Evita Peron (1981, TV Movie) .... Old woman
 The Quest (1982, TV Series)
 Joanie Loves Chachi (1983, TV Series) .... Aunt Gina
 1st & Ten (1985, TV Series) .... Mama Arcola
 Booker (1990, TV Series) .... Grandma Petrelli
 The New Adam-12 (1991, TV Series) .... Old Woman on Bus
 Lookin' Italian (1998) .... Grandmother
 Everybody Loves Raymond (1998, TV Series) .... Zia Sarina
 That's Life (2000, TV Series) .... Aunt Rose
 The 4th Tenor (2002) .... Neighbor Woman (final film role)

References

External links

 
 
 

1907 births
2005 deaths
20th-century Argentine actresses
Actresses from Buenos Aires
Argentine emigrants to the United States
Argentine film actresses
Argentine people of Sicilian descent
Argentine television actresses
Expatriate actresses in the United States